Dendrobium canaliculatum, commonly known as the brown tea tree orchid or thin tea tree orchid, is an epiphytic or lithophytic orchid in the family Orchidaceae. It has cone-shaped or onion-shaped pseudobulbs, up to six deeply channelled, dark green leaves and up to thirty star-shaped, light brown to caramel-coloured white or greenish to apricot-coloured flowers with darker tips. It grows in tropical North Queensland and New Guinea.

Description 
The side lobes curve upwards and the middle lobe has three wavy ridges. Flowering occurs between August and November.

Taxonomy and naming
Dendrobium canaliculatum was first formally described in 1810 by Robert Brown and the description was published in his Prodromus Florae Novae Hollandiae et Insulae Van Diemen. The specific epithet (canaliculatum) is Latin word meaning "channelled" or "grooved".

There are two varieties of this orchid:
 Dendrobium canaliculatum var. canaliculatum – the brown tea tree orchid which usually grows on stunted trees in woodland, grassy forest and along streams on the Cape York Peninsula and in southern New Guinea.
 Dendrobium canaliculatum var. foelschi (F.Muell.) Rupp & T.E.Hunt – the thin tea tree orchid, which is smaller than var. canaliculum in all its parts, has white flowers with yellow or tan tips, grows in coastal areas, often on the freshwater mangrove (Barringtonia acutangula) and occurs in northern parts of the Northern Territory, Queensland, including some of the Torres Strait Islands and the Kimberley region of Western Australia.

References 

canaliculatum
Orchids of Queensland
Epiphytic orchids
Plants described in 1810